All About Love (得閒炒飯 De xian chao fan) is a 2010 Hong Kong film directed and produced by Ann Hui. Based on a true story, the plot concerns two bisexual women who had been lovers in the past and meet again years later in a counseling session for expectant mothers. Hui said in an interview that initially "There were no investors" for the film because the subject of same-sex relationships was banned in China, and the Hong Kong film industry relied on the Chinese market.

Ms. Hui, a graduate of the London Film School, described the film as "serious...but it is also very commercial," adding that "Sometimes it is better to make serious issues more acceptable to audiences, by making it a comedy and having big stars so that people will come watch the movie."

Cast

 Sandra Ng as Macy
 Vivian Chow as Anita
 Cheung Siu-fai as Robert
 William Chan as Mike
 Joey Meng as Eleanor
 Queenie Chu
 Fan Yik-Man
 Fung Bo Bo
 Raven Hanson
 Serina Ha
 Jo Kuk as Waiwai
 Abe Kwong
 Eman Lam
 Rick Lau
 Tina Lau
 Jayson Li

Release
All About Love had its world premiere at the Hong Kong Summer International Film Festival on 11 August 2010; followed by theatrical release on 26 August 2010.

Its international premiere was held at the 2010 Toronto International Film Festival on 13 September 2010. It was screened by the Denver Film Society at the 2011 Cinema Q Film Festival, and by the San Francisco Film Society in the inauguration of its "Hong Kong Cinema Series" festival in 2011.

Accolades

References

Further reading

External links
 
  All About Love at Hong Kong Movie DataBase
  All About Love at Hong Kong Cinemagic
  All About Love at Hong Kong Film Development Council
  All About Love at LoveHKFilm

2010 films
2010 LGBT-related films
2010s Cantonese-language films
Films directed by Ann Hui
Hong Kong LGBT-related films
Lesbian-related films
LGBT-related drama films
2010 drama films
2010s Hong Kong films